Hogg may refer to:

Persons with the surname Hogg:

 Hogg (surname)

In fiction:
Boss Hogg from the television show Dukes of Hazzard, with many fictional Hogg relatives
Wernham Hogg, the fictional paper company from the British TV series The Office
Hogg (novel), a novel by Samuel R. Delany

Other:
Head on, gilled and gutted, a term used in the fishing industry.
Hogg Robinson Group (HRG), an international company specializing in corporate services
Hogg (crater), on the Moon
Hogg, a young sheep of either sex from about 9 to 18 months of age (until it cuts two teeth).
Jim Hogg County, Texas